SF Film Finland Oy (formerly FS Film Oy) is a Finnish film distributor established in 2000. It is part of Bonnier Group and a subsidiary of AB Svensk Filmindustri. SF Film Finland is the leading film distributor in Finland, with market shares of 30.67% in admissions and 31.04% in box office (2011). The company distributes approximately 45 theatrical premieres and 400 new DVD releases annually.

References

External links 
 SF Film Finland Oy — at Elonet.
 FS Film Oy / FS Film / SF Film Finland — at the Internet Movie Database−IMDb.

Film organisations in Finland
Film distributors
Entertainment companies of Finland
Mass media companies of Finland
Entertainment companies established in 2000
Mass media companies established in 2000
2000 establishments in Finland
Bonnier Group